Dangerous is an album by the Memphis, Tennessee band the Bar-Kays, released on Mercury Records in April 1984. The album reached number seven on the Billboard R&B albums chart. The song "Freakshow on the Dancefloor", was featured in the film, Breakin', and appeared on its soundtrack album.

Track listing
All tracks composed by Allen Jones and The Bar-Kays
"Dangerous"   	 5:26   	
"Dirty Dancer" 	4:35 	
"Make Believe Lover" 	5:13 	
"Dance, Party, Etc." 	5:20 	
"Freakshow on the Dance Floor" 	6:36 	
"Lovers Should Never Fall in Love" 	3:53 	
"Loose Talk" 	4:20 	
"Sexomatic" 	5:21

Charts

Singles

References

External links
 The Bar-Kays-Dangerous at Discogs

1984 albums
Bar-Kays albums
Mercury Records albums